"How Do You Keep the Music Playing?" is a song composed by Michel Legrand, with lyrics by Alan and Marilyn Bergman for the 1982 film Best Friends, where it was introduced by James Ingram and Patti Austin. The Austin/Ingram version became a single in 1983 and reached #45 on the Billboard Hot 100 and #5 on the Billboard Adult Contemporary chart.  It was one of three songs with lyrics by Alan and Marilyn Bergman that were nominated for the Academy Award for Best Original Song at the 55th Academy Awards.

Notable versions
 Susannah McCorkle — How Do You Keep the Music Playing (1985)
 Frankie Laine — Place in Time (1985) and Wheels of a Dream (1998)
 Andy Williams — Close Enough for Love (1986)
 Tony Bennett — The Art of Excellence (1986), Duets: An American Classic (with George Michael) (2006) and Duets II (with Aretha Franklin) (2011)
 George Benson with the Count Basie Orchestra (with Carmen Bradford) — Big Boss Band (1990)
 Shirley Bassey — Keep the Music Playing (1991)
 Former Ladies of the Supremes — included in several compilation albums, including Baby Love and Live, Live, Live (1991)
 Steve Smith & Buddy's Buddies — Steve Smith & Buddy's Buddies
 Johnny Mathis — How Do You Keep the Music Playing? (1993)
 Pieces of a Dream — In Flight (1993)
 Frank Sinatra — L.A. Is My Lady (1984), Duets II (with Lorrie Morgan) (1994)
 Vocal Majority — How Do You Keep the Music Playing (1996)
 Carl Anderson — Why We Are Here! (1997)
 Maureen McGovern — The Music Never Ends: The Lyrics of Alan & Marilyn Bergman (1997)
 The SuperJazz Big Band of Birmingham, Alabama recorded the song on the CD, UAB SuperJazz, Featuring Ellis Marsalis (2001) Arranged and sung by Ray Reach.
 Barbra Streisand — The Movie Album (2003)
 Rigmor Gustafsson — On My Way to You (2006)
 Salena Jones — Salena sings pop favorites (orchestra and sax) (2009)
 Martin Nievera (Featuring Kyla) — As Always (2010) 
 Celine Dion — Loved Me Back to Life (Deluxe Edition) (2013)
 Bradley Walsh — Chasing Dreams (2016)
 Faith Cuneta & Daniel Briones — Still The One (Album by Faith Cuneta)  (2022)
 The Choir of Trinity College, Cambridge directed by Stephen Layton recorded the song in 2015 in an arrangement by Alexander L'Estrange with soloist Helen Charlston. This recording was not officially released but it is available on YouTube. 

Live versions
 Thomas Anders — Live Concert (1997)
 Michel Legrand & Kuh Ledesma — Performed live at the PICC Plenary Hall in Manila (2002)
 Céline Dion — Celine - A holographic duet with herself (2011) 
 Brian McKnight & Kyla — Performed live at the Araneta Coliseum in Manila (2012)
 Tony Bennett — Performed live on the PBS special "Cheek To Cheek LIVE!" and NBC special "Tony Bennett Celebrates 90"  (2016)
 Lea Salonga — Blurred Lines (2017)'' — Performed live on "Feinstein's/54 Below"  (2016)

References

1982 songs
1983 singles
Songs with lyrics by Alan Bergman
Songs with lyrics by Marilyn Bergman
Songs with music by Michel Legrand
Barbra Streisand songs
Frank Sinatra songs
Andy Williams songs
Male–female vocal duets
1980s ballads